Alpes Isère Tour is a road bicycle race held annually in the French Department of Rhône-Alpes. The editions 1991–2004 were reserved to amateurs; since 2005, it is organized as a 2.2 event on the UCI Europe Tour.

1991–2005: Tour Nord-Isère
2006–2019: Rhône-Alpes Isère Tour
2021– : Alpes Isère Tour

Winners

References

External links

Recurring sporting events established in 1991
1991 establishments in France
UCI Europe Tour races
Cycle races in France
May sporting events